Gawsworth is a civil parish in Cheshire East, England. It contains 20 buildings that are recorded in the National Heritage List for England as designated listed buildings.  Of these, three are listed at Grade I, the highest grade, two are listed at Grade II*, the middle grade, and the others are at Grade II.  Apart from the village of Gawsworth, the parish is rural.  The most important buildings in the parish, all listed at Grade I, are Gawsworth Old Hall and associated structures, St James' Church, also with associated structures, and the Old Rectory.  Listed at Grade II* are Gawsworth New Hall and an associated barn.  The Macclesfield Canal runs through the parish, and there are three listed structures associated with this, two bridges and a milestone.  The other listed buildings are houses, farm buildings, a grave, a public house, a war memorial, and a boundary stone.

Key

Buildings

See also

Listed buildings in Bosley
Listed buildings in Henbury
Listed buildings in Macclesfield
Listed buildings in Marton
Listed buildings in North Rode
Listed buildings in Siddington
Listed buildings in Sutton

References
Citations

Sources

 

 

Listed buildings in the Borough of Cheshire East
Lists of listed buildings in Cheshire